Bob Nakata (April 2, 1941 – July 12, 2021) was an American politician who served in the Hawaii House of Representatives from 1983 to 1987 and in the Hawaii Senate from 1999 to 2003.

He died on July 12, 2021, in Honolulu, Hawaii, at age 80.

References

1941 births
2021 deaths
Politicians from Honolulu
Democratic Party members of the Hawaii House of Representatives
Democratic Party Hawaii state senators